Andrew Pugsley (born 25 July 1978) is a former Australian rules footballer who played for Collingwood in the Australian Football League (AFL).

Pugsley came to Collingwood as a rookie late in 1996 from Scoreseby via Eastern Ranges. His versatility as a forward, where he could play tall and small were valued, and his form in the reserves in 1997 as a goalkicker saw him elevated to the senior list for 1998. He kicked two goals on debut, his first two kicks resulted in goals, a very rare achievement. He played only five games, before being delisted from the club at the end of 98. His final game was the Round 8 Queens Birthday loss to Melbourne where he performed admirably in a losing side taking a strong last quarter mark, however it was not enough to hold his place and he was delisted from the club at the end of 1998.

He sought a further opportunity at Richmond before finding his feet in the Victorian Football League (VFL) with Box Hill, where he won a premiership in 2001 and captained the side during its longest winning streak (2003).

Pugsley has had a distinguished amateurs career, playing a leading role at the Old Scotch Football Club.

References

External links

Collingwood Football Club players
Box Hill Football Club players
Old Scotch Football Club players
Living people
1978 births
Australian rules footballers from Victoria (Australia)